Grzmiąca may refer to the following places in Poland:
Grzmiąca, Lower Silesian Voivodeship (south-west Poland)
Grzmiąca, Pomeranian Voivodeship (north Poland)
Grzmiąca, Łódź Voivodeship (central Poland)
Grzmiąca, Białobrzegi County in Masovian Voivodeship (east-central Poland)
Grzmiąca, Grodzisk Mazowiecki County in Masovian Voivodeship (east-central Poland)
Grzmiąca, Lubusz Voivodeship (west Poland)
Grzmiąca, West Pomeranian Voivodeship (north-west Poland)